Melacoryphus is a genus of seed bugs in the family Lygaeidae. There are about 11 described species in Melacoryphus, found in Central and North America.

Species
These 11 species belong to the genus Melacoryphus:
 Melacoryphus admirabilis (Uhler, 1872)
 Melacoryphus circumlitus (Stal, 1862)
 Melacoryphus facetus (Say, 1831)
 Melacoryphus lagunensis Cervantes & Brailovsky, 2014
 Melacoryphus lateralis (Dallas, 1852)
 Melacoryphus micropterus Slater Alex, 1988
 Melacoryphus nigrinervis (Stal, 1874)
 Melacoryphus pedregalensis Brailovsky, 1977
 Melacoryphus rubicollis (Uhler, 1894)
 Melacoryphus rubriger (Stal, 1862)
 Melacoryphus rubrolimbatus Slater Alex, 1988

References

Further reading

External links

 

Lygaeidae